Sjors Verdellen (born 29 November 1981) is a Dutch former professional footballer who played as a centre back.

Career
Born in Tegelen, Verdellen began his career in 1999 with VVV-Venlo, and later played with MVV Maastricht.

References

1981 births
Living people
People from Tegelen
Association football central defenders
Dutch footballers
VVV-Venlo players
MVV Maastricht players
Eredivisie players
Eerste Divisie players
Derde Divisie players
Footballers from Limburg (Netherlands)